Supergirl is an American superhero action-adventure drama television series developed by Ali Adler, Greg Berlanti, and Andrew Kreisberg, based on the DC Comics character Supergirl, created by Otto Binder and Al Plastino, that originally aired on CBS and premiered on October 26, 2015. Supergirl is a costumed superheroine who is the biological cousin to Superman and one of the last surviving Kryptonians. The series was officially picked up on May 6, 2015, and received a full season order on November 30, 2015. The series moved from CBS to The CW from its second season onwards.

Series overview

Episodes

Season 1 (2015–16)

Season 2 (2016–17)

Season 3 (2017–18)

Season 4 (2018–19)

Season 5 (2019–20)

Season 6 (2021)

Notes

References 

General references
 

Lists of American action television series episodes
Lists of American drama television series episodes
Lists of American fantasy television series episodes
Lists of American science fiction television series episodes
Lists of Arrowverse episodes